Windsor Academy is a private Christian school in Bibb County, Georgia, United States. The school provides education from preschool to high school, primarily following a liberal arts model with Christian influence.

History
Windsor Academy was founded in 1970 as a segregation academy to serve white students  in the area south of Macon. The same year, Tattnall Square Academy, First Presbyterian Day School, and  Central Fellowship Christian Academy were founded for the same purpose. Located on Jones Road, it was originally financed by the memberships of ten families.

Notable alumni
 Jason Aldean – country music recording artist
 Nancy Grace – prosecutor, CNN and Court TV host

References

External links
 

Christian schools in Georgia (U.S. state)
Schools in Macon, Georgia
Segregation academies in Georgia
Private high schools in Georgia (U.S. state)
Private middle schools in Georgia (U.S. state)
Private elementary schools in Georgia (U.S. state)
Educational institutions established in 1970
1970 establishments in Georgia (U.S. state)